Ignacio Rolón (born 23 November 1974 in San Antonio, Paraguay) is a Paraguayan footballer currently playing for General Díaz of the Paraguayan Division Intermedia.

Teams
  Sportivo Luqueño 1999
  Atlético Colegiales 2000–2001
  12 de Octubre 2002–2005
  Deportes La Serena 2005
  Olimpia 2006–2007
  The Strongest 2008
  General Díaz 2009–present

References
 

1974 births
Living people
Paraguayan footballers
Paraguayan expatriate footballers
12 de Octubre Football Club players
Club Olimpia footballers
Atlético Colegiales players
The Strongest players
Deportes La Serena footballers
Expatriate footballers in Chile
Expatriate footballers in Bolivia
Association football defenders
Association football forwards